Ted Shawn (born Edwin Myers Shawn; October 21, 1891 – January 9, 1972) was a male pioneer of American modern dance. He created the Denishawn School together with his wife Ruth St. Denis. After their separation he created the all-male company Ted Shawn and His Men Dancers. With his innovative ideas of masculine movement, he was one of the most influential choreographers and dancers of his day. He was also the founder and creator of Jacob's Pillow Dance Festival in Massachusetts, and "was knighted by the King of Denmark for his efforts on behalf of the Royal Danish Ballet."

Ted Shawn and the creation of Denishawn 

Ted Shawn was born in Kansas City, Missouri on October 21, 1891. Originally intending to become a minister of religion, he attended the University of Denver. While attending the university, he caught diphtheria at the age of 19 causing him temporary paralysis from the waist down. It was during his physical therapy for the disease that Shawn was introduced to dance by way of studying with Hazel Wallack in 1910, a former dancer with the Metropolitan Opera. In 1912, Shawn relocated to Los Angeles where he became part of an exhibition ballroom dance troupe with Norma Gould as his partner.

It wasn't until moving to New York in 1914 that Shawn realized his true potential as an artist upon meeting Ruth St. Denis. The two were married within 2 months on August 13, 1914. St. Denis served not only as a partner but an extremely valuable creative outlet to Shawn. Both artists believed strongly in the potential for dance as an art form becoming integrated into everyday life. The combination of their mutual artistic vision, as well as Shawn's business knowledge, led to the couple opening the first Denishawn School in Los Angeles, California in 1915, with the goal being to meld dance together with the body, mind, and spirit.

Notable performances choreographed by him during Denishawn's 17-year run include Invocation to the Thunderbird" (1917), the solo Danse Americaine, performed by Charles Weidman (1923), Julnar of the Sea, Xochitl performed by Martha Graham (1920) and Les Mysteres Dionysiaques. In addition to spawning the careers of Weidman and Graham, the Denishawn school also housed Louise Brooks and Doris Humphrey as students.

Style and technique 
Together, Shawn and Ruth St. Denis established an eclectic grouping of dance techniques including ballet (done without shoes), and movement that focused less on rigidity and more on the freeing of the upper body. To add to St. Denis' mainly eastern influence, Shawn brought the spirit of North African, Spanish, American and Amerindian influence to the table. The Denishawn Company, founded by Shawn and St. Denis in 1914, ushered in a new era of modern American dance. Breaking with European traditions, their choreography connected the physical and spiritual, often drawing from ancient, indigenous, and international sources. St. Denis's and Shawn's Orientalism and cultural appropriation raise questions of imperialism, colonization, and racism.

Ted Shawn and His Male Dancers 

Due to Shawn's marital problems and financial difficulties, Denishawn closed in the early 1930s. Subsequently, Shawn formed an all-male dance company of athletes he taught at Springfield College, with the mission to fight for acceptance of the American male dancer and to bring awareness of the art form from a male perspective.

The all-male company was based out of a farm that Shawn purchased near Lee, Massachusetts. On July 14, 1933, Ted Shawn and His Men Dancers had their premier performance at Shawn's farm, which would later be known as Jacob's Pillow Dance Festival. Shawn produced some of his most innovate and controversial choreography to date with this company such as "Ponca Indian Dance", "Sinhalese Devil Dance", "Maori War Haka", "Hopi Indian Eagle Dance", "Dyak Spear Dances", and "Kinetic Molpai". Through these creative works Shawn showcased athletic and masculine movement that soon would gain popularity. The company performed in the United States and Canada, touring more than 750 cities, in addition to international success in London and Havana. Ted Shawn and His Men Dancers concluded at Jacob's Pillow on August 31, 1940, with a homecoming performance.

Shawn had a romantic relationship with one of his dancers, Barton Mumaw, from 1931 to 1948. One of the leading stars of the company, Barton Mumaw would emerge onto the dance industry and be considered "the American Nijinsky". While with Shawn, Mumaw began a relationship with John Christian, a stage manager for the company. Mumaw introduced Shawn to Christian. Later, Shawn formed a partnership with Christian, with whom he stayed from 1949 until his death in 1972.

Jacob's Pillow 
With this new company came the creation of Jacob's Pillow: a dance school, retreat, and theater. The facilities also hosted teas, which, over time, became the Jacob's Pillow Dance Festival. Shawn also created The School of Dance for Men around this time, which helped promote male dance in colleges nationwide.

Shawn taught classes at Jacob's Pillow just months before his death at the age of 80. In 1965, Shawn was a Heritage Award recipient of the National Dance Association. Shawn's final appearance on stage in the Ted Shawn Theater at Jacob's Pillow was in Siddhas of the Upper Air, where he reunited with St. Denis for their fiftieth anniversary.

Saratoga Springs is now the home of the National Museum of Dance, the United States' only museum dedicated to professional dance. Shawn was inducted into the museum's Mr. & Mrs. Cornelius Vanderbilt Whitney Hall of Fame in 1987.

Writings 
Ted Shawn wrote and published nine books that provided a foundation for Modern Dance:
 1920 – Ruth St. Denis: Pioneer and Prophet
 1926 – The American Ballet
 1929 – Gods Who Dance
 1935 – Fundamentals of a Dance Education
 1940 – Dance We Must
 1944 – How Beautiful Upon the Mountain
 1954 – Every Little Movement: a Book About Francois Delsarte
 1959 – Thirty-three Years of American Dance
 1960 – One Thousand and One Night Stands (autobiography, with Gray Poole)

Legacy 
In the 1940s, Shawn bestowed his works to the Museum of Modern Art. The museum subsequently deaccessed these works, giving them to New York Public Library for the Performing Arts and Jacob's Pillow archive, while Shawn was still alive. Dancer Adam Weinert saw this as a violation of MoMA's policy not to sell or give away works by living artists, and created The Reaccession of Ted Shawn, digital, augmented reality performances of Shawn's works to be displayed in MoMA.

See also
 List of dancers

References

Further reading

External links 

 
 
 John Willis Collection of Ted Shawn at the Harry Ransom Center
 
 Ted Shawn papers, Jerome Robbins Dance Division, New York Public Library for the Performing Arts.
 Ted Shawn papers, Additions, Jerome Robbins Dance Division, New York Public Library for the Performing Arts.
 
 The Reaccession of Ted Shawn danced by Adam Weinert

Media 
Archive footage
 Ted Shawn's Men Dancers performing in Finale from The New World in 1936 at Jacob's Pillow Dance Festival
 Ted Shawn performing Nobody Knows the Trouble I've Seen from Four Dances Based on American Folk Music in 1938 at Jacob's Pillow
 Ted Shawn's Men Dancers performing Kinetic Molpai in 1937 at Jacob's Pillow
 Jacob's Pillow Men Dancers rehearsing Kinetic Molpai with Barton Mumaw in 1992 at Jacob's Pillow
 Ted Shawn's Men Dancers performing in Sixth Prelude from The Well Tempered Clavichord in 1933 at Jacob's Pillow Dance Festival
 Barton Mumaw performing Ted Shawn's O Brother Sun and Sister Moon (A Study of St. Francis) in 1981 at Jacob's Pillow Dance Festival
Photographs
 Photograph of Ted Shawn by James Walter Collinge (10th picture in gallery)

1891 births
1972 deaths
Modern dancers
Martha Graham
Place of death missing
University of Denver alumni
American choreographers
American male dancers
Artists from Kansas City, Missouri
LGBT dancers
LGBT people from Missouri
20th-century American dancers